Louisiana was a dominant population center in the southwest of the Confederate States of America, controlling the wealthy trade center of New Orleans, and contributing the French Creole and Cajun populations to the demographic composition of a predominantly Anglo-American country. In the antebellum period, Louisiana was a slave state, where enslaved African Americans had comprised the majority of the population during the eighteenth-century French and Spanish dominations. By the time the United States acquired the territory (1803) and Louisiana became a state (1812), the institution of slavery was entrenched. By 1860, 47% of the state's population were enslaved, though the state also had one of the largest free black populations in the United States. Much of the white population, particularly in the cities, supported slavery, while pockets of support for the U.S. and its government existed in the more rural areas.

Louisiana declared that it had seceded from the Union on January 26, 1861. Civil-War era New Orleans, the largest city in the South, was strategically important as a port city due to its southernmost location on the Mississippi River and its access to the Gulf of Mexico. The U.S. War Department early on planned for its capture. The city was taken by U.S. Army forces on April 25, 1862. Because a large part of the population had Union sympathies (or compatible commercial interests), the U.S. government took the unusual step of designating the areas of Louisiana then under U.S. control as a state within the Union, with its own elected representatives to the U.S. Congress. For the latter part of the war, both the U.S. and the Confederacy recognized their own distinct Louisiana governors. Similarly, New Orleans and 13 named parishes of the state were exempted from the Emancipation Proclamation, which applied exclusively to states in rebellion against the Union.

Politics and strategy in Louisiana

Secession

On January 8, 1861, Louisiana Governor Thomas Overton Moore ordered the Louisiana militia to occupy the U.S. arsenal at Baton Rouge and the U.S. forts guarding New Orleans, Fort Jackson and Fort St. Philip. A wealthy planter and slave holder, Moore acted aggressively to engineer the secession of Louisiana from the Union by a convention on January 23. Only five percent of the public were represented in the convention, and the state's military actions were ordered before secession had been established—in defiance of the state constitution, which called for a popular referendum to establish a convention. Moore attempted to justify these actions, saying: "I do not think it comports with the honor and self-respect of Louisiana as a slave-holding state to live under the government of a Black Republican president", using an epithet for Republicans used by many Democrats at the time.

The strategies advanced to defend Louisiana and the other Gulf states of the Confederacy were first, the idea of King Cotton; that an unofficial embargo of cotton to Europe would force Britain to use its navy to intervene in protecting the new Confederacy. The second was a privateer fleet established by the issue of letters of marque and reprisal by President Jefferson Davis, which would sweep the sea clear of U.S. naval and commercial ships, and at the same time sustain Louisiana's booming port economy. The third was a reliance on the ring of pre-war masonry forts of the Third System of American coastal defense, combined with a fleet of revolutionary new ironclads, to safeguard the mouth of the Mississippi from the U.S. Navy. All of these strategies were failures.

In March 1861, George Williamson, the Louisianan state commissioner, addressed the Texan secession convention, where he called upon the slave states of the U.S. to declare secession from the Union in order to continue practicing slavery:

One Louisianan artillery soldier gave his reasons for fighting for the Confederacy, stating that "I never want to see the day when a negro is put on an equality with a white person. There is too many free niggers ... now to suit me, let alone having four millions."

Union plans

The Union's response to Moore's leveraged secession was embodied in U.S. President Abraham Lincoln's realization that the Mississippi River was the "backbone of the Rebellion." If control of the river were accomplished, the largest city in the Confederacy would be taken back for the Union, and the Confederacy would be split in half. Lincoln moved rapidly to back Admiral David Dixon Porter's idea of a naval advance up the river to both capture New Orleans and maintain Lincoln's political support; by supplying cotton to northern textile manufacturers and renewing trade and exports from the port of New Orleans. The U.S. Navy would become both a formidable invasion force and a means of transporting Union forces, along the Mississippi River and its tributaries. This strategic vision would prove victorious in Louisiana.

Notable Civil War leaders from Louisiana
A number of notable leaders were associated with Louisiana during the Civil War, including some of the Confederate army's senior ranking generals, as well as several men who led brigades and divisions. Antebellum Louisiana residents P.G.T. Beauregard, Braxton Bragg, and Richard Taylor all commanded significant independent armies during the war. Taylor's forces were among the last active Confederate armies in the field when the war closed.

Henry Watkins Allen led a brigade during the middle of the war before becoming the Confederate Governor of Louisiana from 1864 to 1865. Randall L. Gibson, another competent brigade commander, became a postbellum U.S. Senator as a Democrat. Other brigadiers of note included Alfred Mouton (killed at the Battle of Mansfield), Harry T. Hays, Chatham Roberdeau Wheat (commander of the celebrated "Louisiana Tigers"  of the Army of Northern Virginia), and Francis T. Nicholls (commander of the "Pelican Brigade" until he lost his left foot at Chancellorsville). St. John Lidell was a prominent brigade commander in the Army of Tennessee.

Henry Gray, a wealthy plantation owner from Bienville Parish, was a brigadier general under Richard Taylor before being elected to the Second Confederate Congress late in the war. Leroy A. Stafford was among a handful of Louisiana generals to be killed during the war. Albert Gallatin Blanchard was a rarity—a Confederate general born in Massachusetts.

Governor Thomas Overton Moore, came held office from 1860 through early 1864. When war erupted, he unsuccessfully lobbied the Confederate government in Richmond for a strong defense of New Orleans. Two days before the city surrendered in April 1862, Moore and the legislature abandoned Baton Rouge as the state capital, relocating to Opelousas in May. Thomas Moore organized military resistance at the state level, ordered the burning of cotton, cessation of trade with the Union forces, and heavily recruited troops for the state militia.

Battles in Louisiana

Battles in Louisiana tended to be concentrated along the major waterways, like the Red River Campaign.

Restoration to Union
Following the end of the Civil War, Louisiana was part of the Fifth Military District.

After meeting the requirements of Reconstruction, including ratifying amendments to the US Constitution to abolish slavery and grant citizenship to former slaves, Louisiana's representatives were readmitted to Congress. The state was fully restored to the United States on July 9, 1868.

As part of the Compromise of 1877, under which Southern Democrats acknowledged Republican Rutherford B. Hayes as president, there was the understanding that the Republicans would meet certain demands. One affecting Louisiana was the removal of all U.S. military forces from the former Confederate states. At the time, U.S. troops remained in only Louisiana, South Carolina, and Florida, but the Compromise saw their complete withdrawal from the region.

See also 

 List of Louisiana Confederate Civil War units, a list of Confederate Civil War units from Louisiana.
 List of Louisiana Union Civil War units, a list of Union Civil War units from Louisiana.

Notes
Abbreviations used in these notes
Official atlas: Atlas to accompany the official records of the Union and Confederate armies.
ORA (Official records, armies): War of the Rebellion: a compilation of the official records of the Union and Confederate Armies.
ORN (Official records, navies): Official records of the Union and Confederate Navies in the War of the Rebellion.

References

Further reading

 Ayres, Thomas.  Dark and Bloody Ground: The Battle of Mansfield and the Forgotten Civil War in Louisiana (2001) 
 
 Dew, Charles B. "Who Won the Secession Election in Louisiana?." Journal of Southern History (1970): 18–32. in JSTOR
 Dew, Charles B. "The Long Lost Returns: The Candidates and Their Totals in Louisiana's Secession Election." Louisiana History (1969): 353–369. in JSTOR
 Dimitry, John. Confederate Military History of Louisiana: Louisiana in the Civil War, 1861–1865 (2007) 
 Dufrene, Dennis J. Civil War Baton Rouge, Port Hudson and Bayou Sara: Capturing the Mississippi. Charleston, South Carolina: The History Press, 2012. .
 
 Hollandsworth Jr, James G. The Louisiana Native Guards: The Black Military Experience During the Civil War (LSU Press, 1995)
 Johnson, Ludwell H.  Red River Campaign, Politics & Cotton in the Civil War  Kent State University Press (1993). .
 Lathrop, Barnes F. "The Lafourche District in 1861–1862: A Problem in Local Defense." Louisiana History (1960) 1#2 pp: 99–129. in JSTOR
 McCrary, Peyton.  Abraham Lincoln and Reconstruction: The Louisiana Experiment (1979)
 Peña, Christopher G.  Touched by War: Battles Fought in the Lafourche District. Thibodaux, Louisiana: C.G.P. Press, 1998.
 Peña, Christopher G. Scarred By War: Civil War in Southeast Louisiana (2004) 
 Pierson, Michael D. Mutiny at Fort Jackson: The Untold Story of the Fall of New Orleans (Univ of North Carolina Press, 2008)
 Ripley, C. Peter. Slaves and Freedmen in Civil War Louisiana (1976) 
 Sledge, Christopher L. "The Union's Naval War in Louisiana, 1861–1863" (Army Command and General Staff College,  2006) online
 Winters, John D. The Civil War in Louisiana. Baton Rouge: Louisiana State University Press, 1963. .
 Wooster, Ralph. "The Louisiana Secession Convention." Louisiana Historical Quarterly (1951) 34#1 pp: 103–133.

External links

 First hand accounts of the Civil War in Louisiana.
 National Park Service map of Civil War sites in Louisiana

 
.American Civil War
American Civil War by state
American Civil War
 
Trans-Mississippi Theater of the American Civil War
Western Theater of the American Civil War